INS Tarmugli (T91) is a patrol vessel of the Car Nicobar-class of Indian Navy and the first ship in the series of four Water Jet Fast Attack Craft (WJFAC). The ship was commissioned by Vice Admiral HCS Bisht AVSM, Flag Officer Commanding-in-Chief, Eastern Naval Command. The indigenously conceived, designed and built ship, named after an island of same name in the Andaman archipelago is capable of operating in shallow waters at high speeds. Built for extended coastal and off-shore surveillance and patrol duties the warship is fitted with advanced MTU engines, water jet propulsion as well as latest communication equipment.

References

Car Nicobar-class patrol vessels
2015 ships